Kunžak is a municipality and village in Jindřichův Hradec District in the South Bohemian Region of the Czech Republic. It has about 1,400 inhabitants.

Administrative parts
Villages of Kaproun, Mosty, Suchdol, Terezín, Valtínov and Zvůle are administrative parts of Kunžak.

References

Villages in Jindřichův Hradec District